DYSW (94.5 FM), broadcasting as 94.5 Radyo Bandera Sweet FM, is a radio station owned by Rizal Memorial Colleges Broadcasting Corporation and operated under an airtime lease agreement by 5K Broadcasting Network. Its studios and transmitter are located at Siaton, Negros Oriental.

The station was formerly under the Radyo Ni Juan network from 2015 to 2019, when 5K Broadcasting Network, Inc. took over its operations.

References

Radio stations in Negros Oriental
Radio stations established in 2015